Monty Wright (29 May 1931 – 6 April 2012) was an English footballer, who played as a left-footed wing half in the Football League in the 1950s for Stockport County and Chester City F.C.

Monty was in the Leeds United reserves team in 1952-53 and he played with John Charles and Jack Charlton. He retired early from football after suffering a detached retina eye injury. He later went on to run Monty's Newsagents in Farnsfield, Nottinghamshire for 15 years until 1992.

See also 

 1954–55 Chester F.C. season

References

1931 births
2012 deaths
Association football wing halves
English footballers
Leeds United F.C. players
Stockport County F.C. players
Chester City F.C. players
English Football League players